True Grit: Original Motion Picture Soundtrack is a soundtrack to the 2010 film of the same name. True Grit is the 15th Coen brothers film scored by long-time collaborator Carter Burwell. The Coens discussed the idea of using 19th-century church music, "something that was severe (sounding). It couldn't be soothing or uplifting, and at the same time it couldn't be outwardly depressing. I spent the summer going through hymn books," Burwell said.

Johnny Cash's rendition of "God's Gonna Cut You Down" was used in the theatrical trailer. The 1888 hymn "Leaning on the Everlasting Arms" is used as Mattie Ross's theme, and about a quarter of the score is based on it. Iris DeMent's version, from her 2004 album Lifeline, is used during the end credits. Other hymns are also referenced in the score, including "What a Friend We Have in Jesus", "Hold to God's Unchanging Hand", and "The Glory-Land Way". Because the hymns are considered pre-composed music, the score was deemed ineligible to be nominated for Best Original Score in the 2010 Academy Awards.

Track listing

Production credits
 Original Music by Carter Burwell
 Soundtrack Album Produced by Carter Burwell
 Executive in Charge of Music for Paramount Pictures: Randy Spendlove
 Soundtrack Album Coordinator: Jason Richmond
 Conducted by Carter Burwell
 Orchestrated by Carter Burwell and Sonny Kompanek
 Music Scoring Mixer: Michael Farrow
 Additional Engineering: Lawrence Manchester
 Music Recorded at The Manhattan Center, New York City
 Music Mixed at The Body, New York City
 Orchestra Contractor: Sandra Park
 Music Copyist: Tony Finno
 Composer's Assistant: Dean Parker
 Music Editor: Todd Kasow
 Assistant Music Editor: Mick Gormaley
 Mastering by Robert C. Ludwig at Gateway Mastering Studios Inc.

References

External links
 
 Soundtracks for 'True Grit' at Internet Movie Database

2010 soundtrack albums
Western film soundtracks
Instrumental soundtracks
Carter Burwell albums
Nonesuch Records soundtracks
Soundtrack 2010